CP-39,332 is a drug which acts as a serotonin-norepinephrine reuptake inhibitor. Tametraline (1R,4S-), CP-24,442 (1S,4R-), CP-22,185 (cis-), and CP-22,186 (trans-) are stereoisomers of the compound and show varying effects on monoamine reuptake. None of them were ever marketed.

See also 
 Tametraline
 Sertraline
 Indatraline

References 

Aminotetralins
Pfizer brands